Pazer is a cantillation mark found in the Torah, Haftarah, and other books of the Hebrew Bible. The pazer is generally followed by a Telisha ketana or gedola; on rare occasions when it is followed by another Pazer.

The Pazer is used to prolong a word significantly during the reading. This places strong emphasis on the meaning of the particular word.

The Hebrew word פָּזֵ֡ר translates into English as distribute or disseminate. This relates to the high number of notes in its melody. In a mystical interpretation, it shows the distribution of divinity.

Total occurrences

Melody

References

Cantillation marks